Gift is the third studio album and major label debut album by American alternative metal band Taproot. It was released on June 27, 2000. "I" and "Again & Again" were minor Mainstream Rock singles. The album has sold at least 250,000 copies.

Background, writing and recording

Taproot singer Stephen Richards told CMJ New Music Report that the songs on Gift were written in 1997, playing the songs for a few years. He claimed that "Dragged Down" and "Now" were the only songs written specifically for Gift. Taproot spent six weeks working on Gift.

Music and lyrics
Described as a nu metal album, the album's lyrical themes are primarily about topics such as depression and disliking life. Taproot's vocalist Stephen Richards' vocals on the album Gift have been compared to vocalists such as Chino Moreno, Trent Reznor, Jonathan Davis and Mike Patton. The album consists of vocal styles such as singing, rapping, growling and screaming.

Track listing

Notes
Tracks 2, 6, 7, 9 and 11 are re-recordings of early songs the appeared on the demos, "...Something More Than Nothing" and "Upon Us". Both were released in 1998 and 1999.
A b-side, "Day By Day", can be found on the Dracula 2000 soundtrack, CD single for "Again & Again" and the Japanese release of "Gift". It would later be released as a digital single in 2020 as part of the Warner Bros. Archive series.
Other b-sides entitled "Thrift Whore", "Strive", and "Get Me" can be found through file-sharing networks. These recordings, along with "Day By Day", would later be officially released on the 2018 boxset  Besides.

Credits
Tom Baker - Digital editing, mastering
Frank Gryner -	Assistant engineer
Scott Humphrey - Mixing
Ted Reiger - Assistant engineer
Stephen Richards - Programming, vocals
Edward Smith - Photography
Ulrich Wild - Engineer, mixing, producer

Charts
Album

Singles - Billboard (United States)

References

2000 debut albums
Atlantic Records albums
Taproot (band) albums
Albums produced by Ulrich Wild